Robert's snow vole (Chionomys roberti) is a species of rodent in the family Cricetidae.
It is found in Azerbaijan, Georgia, the Russian Federation, and Turkey.
Its natural habitats are temperate forests and temperate grassland.

References

 Baillie, J. 1996.  Chionomys roberti.   2006 IUCN Red List of Threatened Species.   Downloaded on 9 July 2007.
Musser, G. G. and M. D. Carleton. 2005. "Superfamily Muroidea". pp. 894–1531 in Mammal Species of the World: a Taxonomic and Geographic Reference. D. E. Wilson and D. M. Reeder eds. Johns Hopkins University Press, Baltimore.

Chionomys
Mammals of Azerbaijan
Rodents of Europe
Mammals of Russia
Mammals of Turkey
Mammals described in 1906
Taxa named by Oldfield Thomas
Taxonomy articles created by Polbot